Apolline Traoré (born 1976) is a Burkinabé filmmaker and producer.

Biography 
She was born in 1976 in Ouagadougou. Her father's profession, a diplomat, led to her travelling the world. At the age of 17, her family moved to the United States and she began her studies at Emerson College in Boston, a well known institution in the field of art and communication.

In the 2000s, she directed several short films, including The Price of Ignorance in 2000 (about a Bostonian rape victim) and Kounandi in 2003, which was selected for the 2004 Toronto International Film Festival. She produced her own feature film, Sous la clarté de la lune, in 2004.

She returned to Burkina Faso in 2005 and started working with Idrissa Ouédraogo. In 2008, she directed a television series, Le testament. The feature films that made her known were Moi Zaphira (2013) and Frontières (2018), a film awards two prizes in February 2017 at Fespaco, a film festival of Ouagadougou.

On 2019 she submitted Desrances, her fourth feature film, to Fespaco and received the award of the best design. In addition to Fespaco, the film has received several awards and honors internationally. In December 2019, the film won three awards at the Kerala International Festival in India. In the same year (2019), this fourth feature film was distinguished with three awards at Sotigui Awards: Sotigui for Best Youngest African Actor 2019 with Nemlin Jemima Naomi, the Sotigui for Best Actor in African Cinema in the Diaspora and the Sotigui d'or 2019 which went to the Haitian actor Jimmy Jean-Louis.

At Benin, the film won the Grand Prix Buste d'or Paulin Soumanou Vieyra in 2019 at the Rencontres cinématographiques et numériques de Cotonou (Recico).

Apolline Traoré has received several honors for her commitment to culture and the advancement of women. In particular, she received the medal for the fight of women in cinema during the Luxor African Film Festival . In 2019, she was distinguished as a Chevalier de l'Ordre du Mérite, des Arts, des Lettres et de la Communication and in 2020, she was installed as an Ambassador of the National Museum of Burkina Faso.

Filmography 
 Desrances (2019)
 Frontières  (2017)
 Moi Zaphira (2013)
 La testament (2008)
 Sous la clarté de la lune (2004)
 Kounandi (2003)
 Monia et Rama (2002)
 The Price of Ignorance (2000)
 Sira (2023)

References

External links 
 

Burkinabé film directors
1976 births
Living people
Burkinabé women film directors
21st-century Burkinabé people